Mariana Joaquina Pereira Coutinho (1748–1820), was a Portuguese courtier and salonist. She was the lady-in-waiting, favorite and confidante of queen Maria I of Portugal, and the host of a famous literary salon.

References
 Trovisqueira, J. P. de Castro e Mello. «2.1 - Dona Mariana-Joaquina-Apolónia de Vilhena Pereira Coutinho». cpvc.planetaclix.pt. A família Costa Pereira De Vilhena Coutinho de Braga. Consultado em 18 de junho de 2011.

1820 deaths
18th-century Portuguese people
Portuguese salon-holders
1748 births
Portuguese nobility
Portuguese ladies-in-waiting
People from Arcos de Valdevez